Hanatiyeh (also Romanized as Ḩanaţīyeh; also known as Ḩanīţīyeh and Khanaţīyeh) is a village in Qaleh Chenan Rural District, in the Central District of Karun County, Khuzestan Province, Iran. At the 2006 census, its population was 127, in 16 families.

References 

Populated places in Karun County